William Brereton, 2nd Baron Brereton (28 February 1611 – April 1664) was an English landowner from Cheshire and member of the Peerage of Ireland who owned estates in County Carlow. A Royalist sympathiser during the Wars of the Three Kingdoms, after the 1660 Stuart Restoration he served as joint Lord Lieutenant of Cheshire and Member of Parliament for Cheshire from 1661 to 1664.

Personal details
Born on 28 February 1611, Brereton was the eldest son of Sir John Brereton (1591–1629), and Anne (1594–1663), daughter of Sir Edward Fitton (1572–1619), owner of Gawsworth Old Hall. Sir John was heir apparent to Sir William Brereton, 1st Baron Brereton of Brereton Hall (1550–1631); his death in 1629 made Brereton the new heir, while his mother remarried, this time to Sir Gilbert Gerard (died 1646), Royalist Governor of Worcester during the First English Civil War. 

One of five surviving children, William had two brothers, John (1624–1656) and Edward, along with two sisters; Jane (died 1648), and Mary (died 1652), whose second husband was another member of the Gerard family, Sir Gilbert Gerard, 1st Baronet of Fiskerton (died 1687).  

In 1629, Brereton married Lady Elizabeth Goring (1615–1687), daughter of George Goring, 1st Earl of Norwich and another substantial Cheshire family. They had a total of 14 children including his heir William (1631–1680), Thomas (1635-1683), Henry (1636–1659), George (1638–1672) and Elizabeth (1645–1724). Several of his daughters died unmarried, as the financial losses he suffered during the civil war made it impossible to provide them with dowrys.

Career

The Brereton family had been established in Cheshire since the 14th century and was split into a number of different branches; the senior line was based at Handforth Hall and headed by another Sir William Brereton (1604–1661), a Puritan who led Parliamentarian forces in Cheshire during the civil war. In 1624, Brereton's grandfather purchased an Irish barony and was appointed Baron Brereton of Leighlin in Leinster, a title inherited by his grandson along with his lands when he died on 1 October 1631. 

He held no military commission during the First English Civil War but in August 1642 was appointed a Commissioner of Array for Cheshire by Charles I, and installed a Royalist garrison at Brereton Hall. Captured in 1644 when Biddulph House in Staffordshire surrendered to Parliamentarian forces, he was restored to his estates by the Committee for Compounding with Delinquents after paying a fine of £2,539.

Although associated with Booth's Uprising in August 1659, he escaped arrest and after the 1660 Stuart Restoration was appointed joint Lord Lieutenant of Cheshire and served as Member of Parliament for Cheshire between 1661 and 1664. He died in April 1664 and was buried on 21 April 1664 in St Oswald's Church, Brereton

References

Sources

External links 
 
 
 

1611 births
1664 deaths
Barons Brereton
Lord-Lieutenants of Cheshire
English MPs 1661–1679
Military personnel from Cheshire
William, 2nd Baron Brereton of Laughlin
Royalist military personnel of the English Civil War